The Halil Bey Mosque (from ) is a historical Ottoman-era mosque in the town of Kavala, Eastern Macedonia and Thrace, in Greece. It is now a museum open to visitors.

History 
It is located in the center of the small peninsula in the port, near the old fortress, and was probably built around the 1530s, which is also when Ibrahim Pasha Mosque is dated. It is the second largest mosque in Kavala, after the aforementioned Ibrahim Pasha. The mosque was built on top of a Byzantine church dedicated to Saint Paraskevi; the remains of the church are now visible through the glass floor of the mosque. It is most likely that the first church was converted into a mosque, and then later the proper mosque building was built on that site, as was common in the areas the Ottomans conquered.

After the Balkan Wars, the mosque along with the greater Kavala region became part of the Kingdom of Greece. At the beginning of the 20th century, the mosque functioned as a girls' school. After the population exchange between Greece and Turkey, Halil Bey mosque and its madrasa (religious school) housed many Greek refugees fleeing Turkey. In the 1930-1940 period, the mosque housed the municipality's philharmonic orchestra and was thus dubbed the "Mosque of Music". To this day, people of Kavala call it "Old Music [hall]". The mosque's minaret was torn down in the 1950s.

After a series of restoration works for both the mosque and the madrasa (but not the minaret), it is now open to public and functions as a museum and a venue hall.

Architecture 
The mosque was part of a wider complex that also included a madrasa which had eight rooms for students and which has also been preserved in good condition. It is bright red in colour.

Gallery

See also 

 Islam in Greece
 List of mosques in Greece
 List of former mosques in Greece
 Faik Pasha Mosque

References

External links 
 

Buildings and structures in Kavala
Ottoman mosques in Greece
Former mosques in Greece
16th-century mosques
16th-century architecture in Greece
Mosque buildings with domes
Macedonia under the Ottoman Empire
Museums in Eastern Macedonia and Thrace